St. Lawrence College (SLC) is a College of Applied Arts and Technology with three campuses in Eastern Ontario, namely Brockville (1970), Cornwall (1968) and Kingston (founded September 1969).

History
Prior to the 1960s, only institutes of technology and vocational centres co-existed with universities in the province of Ontario at the post-secondary level, and many of those schools were established primarily to help veterans reintegrate into society in the post-war years. In response to an increasing need for technical education, Minister of Education (later Premier) William Davis, regarded now as the “father of the Ontario College System”, established Ontario's colleges of applied arts and technology to train individuals for employment in their respective communities. St. Lawrence College was founded during this period in 1967 as part of the province's initiative to create many such institutions. These schools were designed to provide career-oriented diploma and certificate courses, as well as continuing education programs in the communities in which they are located.

Brockville was originally proposed as the site for the main campus of St. Lawrence College, but Kingston was ultimately selected, since its larger population base would allow it to support a full campus. For the site, a  piece of farmland was purchased from the Ontario Psychiatric Hospital (now operated by Providence Continuing Care Centre) located at King St. W. and Portsmouth Ave. Brockville would retain a smaller campus, while the Cornwall and Kingston campuses were designed to serve six counties in Eastern Ontario (namely Frontenac, Leeds, Grenville, Dundas, Stormont and Glengary).

Some of the earliest full-time courses offered included such programs as Business Administration, Home Economics, Early Childhood Education, Engineering Technology, and Electronics Technician. Today, about 89 programs are offered.

In response to increasing enrolment, in part due to the double cohort, Ontario college's have received funding for expansion in recent years, including St. Lawrence College which has grown considerably since its founding.

Academics and reputation
The college has approximately 6,700 full-time students and 20,000 part-time registrants in 89 academic programs and employs 829 full- and part-time staff; this includes 414 faculty.

St. Lawrence College has received accreditation to offer Baccalaureate Degree programs in the following areas:
Bachelor of Science in Nursing (BScN) (in partnership with Laurentian University)
Bachelor of Business Administration (in partnership with Laurentian University)
Honours Bachelor of Behavioural Psychology

KPI (Key Performance Indicators) Annual Results for April 2017 indicate the following statistics for St. Lawrence College:
100% of employers were satisfied with the quality of the educational preparation of St. Lawrence College graduates. 
86.5% of SLC graduates found employment within six months of graduation. 
84.5% of graduates were satisfied with the usefulness of their SLC education in achieving their goals after graduation. 
80% of students were satisfied with the overall quality of services, programming and resources available to them at SLC.

Schools and faculty
Applied Arts
Community Services
Business
Computer and Engineering Technology 
Justice Studies 
Health Sciences
Skilled Trades and Apprenticeships 
Hospitality and Culinary Arts 
Languages
Graphic Design
Paramedicine

Scholarships and bursaries
The Government of Canada sponsors an Aboriginal Bursaries Search Tool that lists over 680 scholarships, bursaries, and other incentives offered by governments, universities, and industry to support Aboriginal post-secondary participation. St. Lawrence College scholarships for Aboriginal, First Nations and Métis students include: Brown's First Nations Opportunities Bursary; Aboriginal Postsecondary Education and Training Bursary.

See also
Higher education in Canada
List of colleges in Ontario

References

External links

St. Lawrence College official website
St. Lawrence College Bookstore
Affiliate campus on Kennedy Road, Toronto
 Brockville campus (2288 Parkdale Ave)
 Cornwall campus (2 St. Lawrence Drive)
 Kingston campus (100 Portsmouth Ave)

1967 establishments in Ontario
Educational institutions established in 1967
Colleges in Ontario
Education in Kingston, Ontario
Education in Brockville